The Perija parakeet (Pyrrhura caeruleiceps), also known as Todd's parakeet or in aviculture as Perijá conure, is a species of parrot in the family Psittacidae. There are about 1000-2499 living individuals with a decreasing population trend. In 2001 the Perija parakeet was reclassified from a subspecies of the painted parakeet to an individual species. There are two subspecies of the Perija parakeet, P. c. caeruliceps and P. c. pantchenko. P. c. caeruliceps lives in Sierra de Perijá mountains on the northern border between Columbia and Venezuela. P. c. pantchenko lives in the Perijá Mountains.

References

Birds described in 1947